Zygaenosia fumosa is a moth in the family Erebidae. It was described by Walter Rothschild in 1901. It is found in Papua New Guinea.

Subspecies
Zygaenosia fumosa fumosa
Zygaenosia fumosa flaviventris (Rothschild & Jordan, 1901)

References

Nudariina
Moths described in 1901
Zygaenosia